Essam Tharwat (born July 8, 1986) is an Egyptian professional footballer who currently plays as a goalkeeper for the Egyptian club Al Masry.

Career
In 2017, he joined the promoted team to 2017–18 Egyptian Premier League Alassiouty Sport in a free transfer from Al-Nasr, he signed a 3-year contract.

He later played for Smouha and FC Masr, before joining Al Masry in November 2020.

References

External links
 Essam Tharwat at KOOORA.com
 Essam Tharwat at FilGoal.com

1986 births
Living people
Egyptian footballers
Association football goalkeepers
Al Nasr SC (Egypt) players
Pyramids FC players
Smouha SC players
FC Masr players
Al Masry SC players